Stanley Weintraub (April 17, 1929 – July 28, 2019) was an American historian and biographer and an expert on George Bernard Shaw.

Early life
Weintraub was born in Philadelphia, Pennsylvania, on April 17, 1929. He was the eldest child of Benjamin and Ray Segal Weintraub. He attended South Philadelphia High School, and then he attended West Chester State Teachers College (now West Chester University of Pennsylvania) where he received his B.S. in education in 1949. He continued his education at Temple University where he received his master's degree in English "in absentia," as he was called to duty in the Korean War.

He received a commission in the Army as a second lieutenant, and served with the Eighth Army in Korea, receiving a Bronze Star.

After the war, he enrolled at Pennsylvania State University in September 1953; his doctoral dissertation "Bernard Shaw, Novelist" was accepted on May 6, 1956.

Personal life
He married Rodelle Horwitz in 1954; they had three children, and lived in Newark, Delaware.
He died on July 28, 2019 at the age of 90.

Career
Except for visiting appointments, he remained at Penn State for all of his career, finally attaining the rank of Evan Pugh Professor of Arts and Humanities, with emeritus status on retirement in 2000. From 1970 to 1990 he was also Director of Penn State's Institute for the Arts and Humanistic Studies.

Publications

He was a prolific award-winning author:

Private Shaw and Public Shaw: A Dual Portrait of Arabia and G. B. S.. London: Braziller, 1963. 
The Yellow Book, Quintessence of the Nineties. Ed. with an introd. by Stanley Weintraub.   Garden City, NY: Doubleday 1964. 
The Art of William Golding (with Bernard S. Oldsey).  New York: Harcourt, Brace & World, 1965.
The Savoy: Nineties Experiment. University Park, Pennsylvania State University Press, 1966. 
Reggie: a Portrait of Reginald Turner.  New York: G. Braziller, 1965. 
The Last Great Cause ; the Intellectuals and the Spanish Civil War.  New York: Weybright and Talley, 1968. 
Journey to Heartbreak ; the Crucible Years of Bernard Shaw, 1914–1918.  New York: Weybright and Talley, 1971. 
Beardsley: A Biography. London: Braziller, 1967.   Received National Book Award nomination  in 1967 
Journey to Heartbreak: The Crucible Years of Bernard Shaw. New York: Weybright and Talley, 1971.  Received the George Freedley Award from the American Theatre Library Association in 1971.
Directions in Literary Criticism; Contemporary Approaches to Literature. Ed. by Stanley Weintraub & Philip Young.  University Park Penn. State Univ. Press, 1973.  
Saint Joan: Fifty Years After, 1923/24-1973/74.  Baton Rouge, Louisiana State Univ. Press, 1973.  
Whistler: a Biography.  New York: Weybright and Talley, 1974.  
Lawrence of Arabia: the Literary Impulse.  With Rodelle Weintraub.  Baton Rouge : Louisiana State Univ. Press, 1975.  
Aubrey Beardsley: Imp of the Perverse. University Park: Pennsylvania State Univ. Press, 1976.  
War in the Wards: Korea's Unknown Battle in a Prisoner-of-war Hospital Camp.  2d ed. San Rafael, CA: Presidio Press, 1976.  
Four Rossettis: a Victorian Biography.  New York: Weybright and Talley, 1977.  
The London Yankees: Portraits of American Writers and Artists in London, 1894–1914. New York: Harcourt, 1979.    Received the Freedoms Foundation Award in 1980 
Modern British Dramatists, 1900–1945.  Detroit, Mich.: Gale Research Co., 1982.  
The Unexpected Shaw: Biographical Approaches to George Bernard Shaw and His Work. New York: Ungar, 1982.  
British Dramatists since World War II.  Detroit, Mich.: Gale Research Co., 1982.  
The Portable Bernard Shaw.  New York : Penguin Books, 1986, 1977.
A Stillness Heard Round the World: the End of the Great War, November 1918.  London : Allen & Unwin, 1986, 1985. American ed. published by E. P. Dutton.  
Victoria: An Intimate Biography. New York: Dutton, 1987.  
Bernard Shaw on the London Art Scene, 1885–1950.  Pennsylvania State Univ. Press, 1989.  
Long Day's Journey Into War: December 7, 1941. New York,  Dutton, 1991.  
Bernard Shaw: a Guide to Research.  University Park, PA: Pennsylvania State University Press, 1992.
Disraeli: A Biography. New York: Dutton, 1993.   
Arms and the Man and John Bull's Other Island by George Bernard Shaw, with an Introduction by Stanley and Rodelle Weintraub.  New York: Bantam Books, 1993.
The Last Great Victory : the End of World War II, July–August 1945.  New York : Truman Talley Books, 1995.  
Shaw's People: Victoria to Churchill.  University Park : Pennsylvania State Univ. Press, 1996.  
Uncrowned King: The Life of Prince Albert. New York: Free Press, 1997.  
MacArthur's War: Korea and the Undoing of an American Hero. New York: Free Press, 2000.  
Dear Young Friend the Letters of American Presidents to Children.  Ed. with Rodelle Weintraub.  Mechanicburg: Stackpole Press, 2000.
Edward the Caresser: the Playboy Prince who Became Edward VII. New York: Free Press, 2001.  
Silent Night: The Remarkable Christmas Truce of 1914. New York: Free Press, 2001.  
Charlotte and Lionel: a Rothschild Love Story. New York: Free Press, 2003.  
General Washington's Christmas Farewell: a Mount Vernon Homecoming, 1783. New York: Free Press, 2003.  
Iron Tears: America's Battle for Freedom, Britain's Quagmire, 1775–1783. New York: Free Press, 2005.  (also, subtitled Rebellion in America, 1775–1783.  London: Simon and Schuster, 2005)  
Eleven Days in December. Christmas at the Bulge, 1944. NY: Free Press, 2006.  
15 Stars: Eisenhower, MacArthur, Marshall: Three Generals Who Saved the American Century.  New York: Free Press, 2007.  
General Sherman's Christmas.  Savannah, 1864.  New York: Harper/Smithsonian, 2009.  
Farewell, Victoria!  English Literature 1880–1900.  Greensboro, NC: ELT PRESS / Univ. of North Carolina at Greensboro, 2011.   
Who's Afraid of Bernard Shaw? Some Personalities in Shaw's Plays.  Gainesville, FL: Univ. Press of Florida, 2011.  
Victorian Yankees at Queen Victoria's Court: American Encounters with Victoria and Albert. Newark: Univ. of Delaware Press, 2011.   
Pearl Harbor Christmas: A World at War, December 1941. New York: DaCapo Press (Perseus Books Group), 2011.  
Final Victory: FDR's Extraordinary World War II Presidential Campaign.  New York: Da Capo Press (Perseus Books Group), 2012.  
Young Mr. Roosevelt: FDR's Introduction to War, Politics, and Life.  New York: Da Capo Press (Perseus Books Group), 2013.

Awards
In 2011, he was awarded the Honorary Degree of Doctor of Letters by West Chester University of Pennsylvania. On 11 November 1982, the university inaugurated the "Rodelle and Stanley Weintraub Center for the Study of the Arts and Humanities," containing a collection of their books, papers and memorabilia.

References

External links
 Lecture on Pearl Harbor Christmas at the Pritzker Military Museum & Library
Obituary at Penn State website

Booknotes interview with Weintraub on Disraeli: A Biography, February 6, 1994.

1929 births
2019 deaths
Temple University alumni
West Chester University alumni
20th-century American biographers
Writers from Philadelphia
21st-century American historians
United States Army officers
United States Army personnel of the Korean War
20th-century American historians
American male non-fiction writers
20th-century American male writers
21st-century American male writers
American male biographers
Historians from Pennsylvania
South Philadelphia High School alumni